Władysławów may refer to:
Former Polish name for Kudirkos Naumiestis in Lithuania
Władysławów, Biała Podlaska County in Lublin Voivodeship (east Poland)
Władysławów, Chełm County in Lublin Voivodeship (east Poland)
Władysławów, Janów Lubelski County in Lublin Voivodeship (east Poland)
Władysławów, Łuków County in Lublin Voivodeship (east Poland)
Władysławów, Parczew County in Lublin Voivodeship (east Poland)
Władysławów, Kutno County in Łódź Voivodeship (central Poland)
Władysławów, Łęczyca County in Łódź Voivodeship (central Poland)
Władysławów, Pabianice County in Łódź Voivodeship (central Poland)
Władysławów, Piotrków County in Łódź Voivodeship (central Poland)
Władysławów, Rawa County in Łódź Voivodeship (central Poland)
Władysławów, Tomaszów Mazowiecki County in Łódź Voivodeship (central Poland)
Władysławów, Zgierz County in Łódź Voivodeship (central Poland)
Władysławów, Gmina Garwolin in Masovian Voivodeship (east-central Poland)
Władysławów, Gmina Żelechów in Masovian Voivodeship (east-central Poland)
Władysławów, Grodzisk Mazowiecki County in Masovian Voivodeship (east-central Poland)
Władysławów, Łosice County in Masovian Voivodeship (east-central Poland)
Władysławów, Otwock County in Masovian Voivodeship (east-central Poland)
Władysławów, Piaseczno County in Masovian Voivodeship (east-central Poland)
Władysławów, Płock County in Masovian Voivodeship (east-central Poland)
Władysławów, Przysucha County in Masovian Voivodeship (east-central Poland)
Władysławów, Gmina Iłów in Masovian Voivodeship (east-central Poland)
Władysławów, Gmina Sochaczew in Masovian Voivodeship (east-central Poland)
Władysławów, Zwoleń County in Masovian Voivodeship (east-central Poland)
Władysławów, Żyrardów County in Masovian Voivodeship (east-central Poland)
Władysławów, Greater Poland Voivodeship (west-central Poland)
Władysławów, Silesian Voivodeship (south Poland)